C. H. Kunhambu  is an Indian politician from Kerala, who is currently serving as the MLA of Udma constituency since May 2021. He was member of 12th Kerala Legislative Assembly from Manjeshwar (State Assembly constituency).

References 

Kerala MLAs 2021–2026
Communist Party of India (Marxist) politicians from Kerala
Year of birth missing (living people)
Living people